Bunbury Bridge was a single-track, timber railway bridge in East Perth in Western Australia.  The bridge crossed the Swan River near Claise Brook and was built for passenger and freight traffic to Bunbury on the South Western Railway.

Originally called the Swan Bridge, it was built in 1892 by Atkins and Law. Ultimately, they had to be driven to  before a solid footing was found.

The bridge was opened as part of the Perth to Bunbury Railway, which was officially opened on 8 September 1893 by Governor Robinson. Following concerns for its safety, a so-called "temporary" replacement bridge was built between 1930 and 1932.

After 63 years of use, the temporary structure was closed when a new concrete railway bridge opened in 1995. The old timber bridge was demolished in early 1996.  The 1995 concrete dual-track Goongoongup Bridge was built as part of the electrification of Perth's suburban railways.  Windan Bridge (opened April 2000) is immediately adjacent and carries road traffic from the Graham Farmer Freeway.

See also
Australind (train service)

References

East Perth, Western Australia
Railway bridges in Perth, Western Australia
Bridges completed in 1898
Bridges completed in 1932
Swan River (Western Australia)
Armadale and Thornlie lines
South Western Railway, Western Australia
Burswood, Western Australia
Buildings and structures demolished in 1996
Former railway bridges in Australia
Demolished bridges in Australia